Janiszewo may refer to the following places:
Janiszewo, Greater Poland Voivodeship (west-central Poland)
Janiszewo, Lipno County in Kuyavian-Pomeranian Voivodeship (north-central Poland)
Janiszewo, Włocławek County in Kuyavian-Pomeranian Voivodeship (north-central Poland)
Janiszewo, Pomeranian Voivodeship (north Poland)
Janiszewo, Warmian-Masurian Voivodeship (north Poland)